Nunawading railway station is located on the Lilydale and Belgrave lines in Victoria, Australia. It serves the eastern Melbourne suburb of Nunawading, and opened on 4 June 1888 as Tunstall. It was renamed Nunawading on 1 November 1945.

History
Nunawading station opened on 4 June 1888, almost six years after the line from Camberwell was extended to Lilydale. Like the suburb itself, the station is named after an Indigenous word, 'numphawading', meaning ceremonial ground or battlefield. The area's original name, Tunstall, was named after Tunstall, England, famous for its potteries.

In 1956, boom barriers replaced hand gates at the former Springvale Road level crossing, which was located at the Up end of the station.

In 1979, the station was one of three used as trial sites for new bike lockers under the Melbourne Bicycle Strategy, either for occasional, monthly or quarterly hire.

On 18 December 2009, the original ground-level station closed, as part of a grade separation project to replace the Springvale Road level crossing. It was replaced by a new station in a cutting west of Springvale Road, which opened on 11 January 2010.

Platforms and services
Nunawading consists of an island platform with two faces, and is located on the western side of Springvale Road, with concourses on both sides of the road. The main concourse, on the western side, comprises a customer service counter, an enclosed waiting room, toilets and a café. The concourse on the eastern side is linked to the platforms via an underpass beneath Springvale Road. Both concourses have stairs and lifts that provide access to the platforms. On both concourses of the station there is access to the Ringwood – Box Hill bike path. On the platforms there are metal benches, vending machines and passenger information displays. Long term customer parking is available along the corner of Laughlin Avenue and Springvale Road, on the west side of Springvale Road, as well as Station Street, on the east side of Springvale Road.

The station is served by Lilydale and Belgrave line trains.

Platform 1:
  all stations and limited express services to Flinders Street
  all stations and limited express services to Flinders Street

Platform 2:
  all stations services to Lilydale
  all stations services to Belgrave

Transport links
Kinetic Melbourne operates two bus routes via Nunawading station, under contract to Public Transport Victoria:
 : to The Pines Shopping Centre
  : Chelsea station – Westfield Airport West

Ventura Bus Lines operates one route to and from Nunawading station, under contract to Public Transport Victoria:
 : to Box Hill station

Gallery

References

External links
 
 Melway map at street-directory.com.au

Premium Melbourne railway stations
Railway stations in Melbourne
Railway stations in Australia opened in 1888
Railway stations in the City of Whitehorse